Rachael Boast (born 1975) is a British poet. She has published four poetry collections: Sidereal (2011), Pilgrim Flowers (2013), Void Studies (2016) and Hotel Raphael (2021).

Biography
Rachael Boast was born in Suffolk in 1975. She graduated from Wolverhampton University, studying English and Philosophy. After graduation, she moved to the West Country for ten years.

In 2005, Boast moved to Scotland to work on an MLit in Creative Writing at St. Andrew's University She later was awarded a PhD, her thesis being "an examination  of poetic technique with reference to The Book of Job." Boast's literary role models include: Samuel Taylor Coleridge, Arthur Rimbaud, and poet, artist, and filmmaker Jean Cocteau.

Boast published her first poetry collection, Sidereal, in 2011, her second collection, Pilgrim's Flower, in 2013 and her third collection, Void Studies, in 2016.  Her work was published by Picador Books. Boast's poetry has appeared in literary magazines, including Archipelago, New Statesman and The Yellow Nib. Her work has also appeared in the anthologies Stolen Weather (Castle House Press), The Captain’s Tower: Seventy Poets Celebrate Bob Dylan at Seventy (Seren), and Addicted to Brightness (Long Lunch Press).

Boast spends her time in both Scotland and the West Country.

Poetry collections
Sidereal, Picador Books, (2011)
Pilgrim's Flower, Picador Books, (2013) 
Void Studies, Picador Books, (2016)
Hotel Raphael, Picador Books, (2021)

Awards
 (2011) Forward Prize for best first collection.
 (2012) Seamus Heaney Centre for Poetry Prize for best first collection.
 (2014) Griffin Poetry Prize shortlist for Pilgrims's Flower
 (2015) Bristol Poetry Prize for poem Belle Époqu
 (2016) T. S. Eliot Prize shortlist for Void Studies

References

1975 births
Living people
Alumni of the University of St Andrews
21st-century British women writers
21st-century British poets
Writers from Fife
Alumni of the University of Wolverhampton